The 2016 Fed Cup was the 54th edition of the most important tournament between national teams in women's tennis. The final took place on 12–13 November and was won by the Czech Republic for the third year in a row, and for the fifth time in six years.

World Group

Seeds

Draw

Final

France vs. Czech Republic

World Group play-offs 

The four losing teams in the World Group first round ties, and four winners of the World Group II ties entered the draw for the World Group play-offs. Four seeded teams, based on the latest Fed Cup ranking, were drawn against four unseeded teams.

 will remain in World Group for 2017.
 will remain in World Group II for 2017.

World Group II 

The World Group II was the second highest level of Fed Cup competition in 2016. Winners advanced to the World Group play-offs, and losers played in the World Group II play-offs.

Date: 6–7 February

Seeds
{{columns-list|colwidth=30em|
 
  (World Group II play-off)
  (World Group II play-off)
  (World Group II play-off)
}}

Date: 6–7 February

 World Group II play-offs 

The four losing teams from World Group II played off against qualifiers from Zonal Group I.

 will remain in World Group II in 2017.
 will remain in Zonal Group I in 2017.

 Americas Zone 

 Group I 
Venue: Country Club Las Palmas, Santa Cruz, Bolivia (outdoor clay)

Dates: 3–6 February

Participating teams

Pool A
 
 
 
 

Pool B
 
 
   Play-offs 

  was promoted to the 2016 Fed Cup World Group II play-offs.

 Group II 
Venue: Centro de Tenis Honda, Bayamón, Puerto Rico (outdoor hard)

Dates: 1–6 February

Participating teams

Pool A
 
 
 
 

Pool B
 
 
 
 
 

 Play-offs 

 Asia/Oceania Zone 

 Group I 
Venue: Hua Hin Centennial Sports Club, Hua Hin, Thailand (outdoor hard)

Dates: 3–6 February

Participating teams

Pool A
 
 
 
 

Pool B
 
 
 
 

 Play-offs 

  was promoted to the 2016 Fed Cup World Group II play-offs.
  was relegated to Asia/Oceania Zone Group II in 2017.

 Group II 
Venue: Centennial Sports Club, Hua Hin, Thailand (outdoor hard)

Dates: 11–16 April

Participating teams

Pool A
 
 
 
 Pacific Oceania
 

Pool B
 
 
 
 
 
 

 Play-offs 

  were promoted to Asia/Oceania Group I in 2017.

 Europe/Africa Zone 

 Group I 
Venue: Municipal Tennis Centre, Eilat, Israel (outdoor hard)

Dates: 3–6 February

Participating teams

Pool A
  
  

Pool C
  
  
  
  

Pool B
  
  
 Pool D
 
  
  
  

 Play-offs 

 Group II 
Venue: Gezira Sporting Club, Cairo, Egypt (outdoor clay)

Dates: 13–16 April

Participating teams

Pool A
  
   

Pool B
 
  
  
  Play-offs 

  and '' were relegated to Europe/Africa Zone Group III in 2017.

Group III 
Venue: Bellevue, Ulcinj, Montenegro (outdoor clay) 

Dates: 11–16 April

Participating teams

Pool A
  
  
 
 

Pool C
  
  
  
  

Pool B
  
  
  
 

Pool D

Play-offs 

References

External links 
 fedcup.com

 
2016 in tennis
2016
2016 in women's tennis